Matvey Kuzmich Lyubavsky (Russian: Матве́й Кузьми́ч Люба́вский; 13 August  [O.S. 1 August], 1860, Ryazan Governorate – 22 November 1936, Ufa) was a Russian and Soviet historian, professor, academic and rector of the Moscow University from 1911 to 1917.

Biography 
Lyubavsky was born in to the family of a village deacon. He lost his left eye in an accident during childhood. Lyubavsky graduated from the faculty of History of the Imperial Moscow University in 1882 and received his doctorate in 1901 and became a professor at the Moscow University. 

After the removal of Alexander Manuilov as rector of the Imperial Moscow University in 1911 for political reasons, Lyubavsky was elected as his successor. He opposed the politicization of the educational process, for the preservation of university autonomy, sought to preserve university traditions and a high level of teaching after the departure of many talented scientists. In 1913 he was elected chairman of the Society for Russian History and Antiquities at Moscow University.

Lyubavsky accepted the February Revolution and the return of his former colleagues to the university, however he did recognize the October Revolution like most of the Russian intellectuals of the period. 

After the October Revolution, he began to cooperate with the authorities in the name of saving the country's historical and cultural heritage, its archives. In 1918  he was the head of the Moscow branch of the Moscow Regional Department of Archival Affairs (Glavarkhiv) and until 1920 he was a member of the board, deputy chairman of the Glavarkhiv. In 1920 he was an expert-consultant on archival issues of the People's Commissariat of Foreign Affairs, participated in the Riga conference on the conclusion of a peace treaty between the RSFSR and Poland. From 1920 to 1929 he was the director of the Moscow branch of the legal section of the Unified State archival fund.

He became an Academician of the Academy of Sciences of the Soviet Union in 1929 (Corresponding Member of the Russian Academy of Sciences since 1917).

On August 8, 1930, Lyubavsky was arrested in the so-called "Academic Case" and was in pre-trial detention for a year. In February 1931, his son Valerian was arrested and executed in June for "counter-revolutionary activities". On August 8, 1931, the OGPU Collegium passed a verdict, depriving Lyubavsky of the title of academician and assigning him five years of exile and was exiled to Ufa.

While in exile, he actively collaborated with the Institute of National Culture of the Bashkir ASSR, where during 1932-1934 he worked on the history of land tenure and class struggle in these lands in the 17th-18th centuries. 

He was released on November 5, 1935. Lyubavsky died in Ufa shortly after the expiration of his term of exile, on November 22, 1936 . He was buried at the Sergievsky cemetery in Ufa. He was rehabilitated in 1967.

Bibliography 

 Вдовина Л. Н. Рязанский край в биографии историка, ректора Московского университета М. К. Любавского // Вестник Рязанского государственного университета им. С. А. Есенина. 2009.
 Воробьева И. Г. Ученик и учитель: М. К. Любавский и Н. А. Попов // Труды Исторического факультета Санкт-Петербургского университета. 2013.
 Дворниченко А. Ю. Историография Великого княжества Литовского и «Очерк истории Литовско-Русского государства» М. К. Любавского // Труды Исторического факультета Санкт-Петербургского университета. 2013.
 Дегтярев А. Я., Иванов Ю. Ф., Карев Д. В. Академик М. К. Любавский и его наследие // Любавский М. К. Обзор истории русской колонизации. — М., 1996. — С. 8-72.
 Дегтярёв А. Я. Академик М. К. Любавский — публицист // Власть. 2006. № 6.
 Дегтярёв А. Я. Письмо академика М. К. Любавского (1934 г.) прокурору СССР по поводу «Академического дела» // Памяти академика Сергея Фёдоровича Платонова: исследования и материалы / отв. ред. А. Ю. Дворниченко, С. О. Шмидт. — СПб., 2011. — С. 220—227.
 Ермолаев Ю. Н. Ректор Московского университета М. К. Любавский // Академик М. К. Любавский и Московский университет. — М., 2005.
 Иванов Ю. Ф. М. К. Любавский — выдающийся учёный и педагог // Вопросы истории. 2001. № 10.
 Карев Д. В. Неопубликованные историко-географические труды М. К. Любавского // Археографический ежегодник за 1987 год. — М., 1988. — С. 278—284.
 Карев Д. В. Академик М. К. Любавский: судьба и наследие // Наш радавод: Матэрыялы міжнароднай навуковай канферэнцыі «Царква i культура народау Вялікага княства Литоускага i Беларуси XIII — нач. XX стст.» (Гродна, 28 верасня — 1 кастрычніка 1992 г.). — Гродна, 1994. Кн. 6. Ч. 3.
 Кривоноженко А. Ф Академик М. К. Любавский по материалам «Академического дела» // Труды Исторического факультета Санкт-Петербургского университета. 2013.
 Кривошеев Ю. В. Научное наследие М. К. Любавского и современность // Труды Исторического факультета Санкт-Петербургского университета. 2013.
 Кривошеев Ю. В. М. К. Любавский: арест и первые допросы по «Академическому делу» // Труды Исторического факультета Санкт-Петербургского университета. 2014.
 Лаптева Л. П. Профессор М. К. Любавский как преподаватель истории западных славян в Московском университете (1894—1918) // Вестник Московского университета. Сер. 8. История. 1985. № 2.
 Ливанова Т. Г. Матвей Кузьмич Любавский. Хроника жизни // Любавский М. К. Очерк истории Литовско-Русского государства до Люблинской унии включительно. — СПб.: 2004. — С. 5-13.
 Сборник статей в честь М. К. Любавского. — Пг. 1917. — 803 с.
 Мандрик М. В. На службе Клио: академики М. К. Любавский и Ю. В. Готье // Труды Исторического факультета Санкт-Петербургского университета. 2013.
 Старостин Е. В. М. К. Любавский — историк-архивист // Отечественные архивы. — 2001. — № 1. — С. 33-46.
 Топычканов А. В. Формирование историко-географических представлений М. К. Любавского в контексте развития исторической географии в России // Археографический ежегодник за 2011 г. М.: Наука, 2014. С. 291—302 ISBN 978-5-02-038053-0 [1]
 Толстов В. А. М. К. Любавский — действительный член Рязанской учёной архивной комиссии // Историографическое наследие провинции. Материалы IV научно-практической конференции, посвященной памяти Д. И. Иловайского и М. К. Любавского. Рязань, 21 февраля 2007 г. / Отв. ред. И. Г. Кусова. — Рязань, 2009. — С. 33-45.
 Толстов В. А. Сотрудничество М. К. Любавского с губернскими учеными архивными комиссиями России и оценка их деятельности // Наследие Д. И. Иловайского и М. К. Любавского в русской историографии: Труды Всероссийской научной конференции «VI историографические чтения памяти историков Д. И. Иловайского и М. К. Любавского» (к 180-летию со дня рождения Д. И. Иловайского). Рязань, 22—25 мая 2012 г. / Ред. колл.: Л. В. Чекурин, В. А. Толстов и др. — Рязань, 2012. — С. 167—186.
 Фешкин В. Н. Древняя история башкир в материалах М. К. Любавского // Известия Российского государственного педагогического университета им. А. И. Герцена: Аспирантские тетради. Научный журнал. 2007. № 19 (45). — С. 264—268.
 Фешкин В. Н. Обзор материалов академика М. К. Любавского, хранящихся в городе Уфе // Южный Урал: история, историография, источники. Межвузовский сб. науч. статей. Вып. 3. / Отв. ред. И. З. Шаяхметова. — Уфа, 2011. — С. 117—122.
 Фешкин В. Н. Научная деятельность М. К. Любавского в Башкирии // Труды Исторического факультета Санкт-Петербургского университета. 2013.
 Фешкин В. Н. Материалы академика М. К. Любавского по истории Башкортостана // Вестник Академии наук Республики Башкортостан. 2013.
 Фешкин В. Н. Новые материалы о жизни и деятельности академика М. К. Любавского в городе Уфе // Вестник Академии наук Республики Башкортостан. 2018.
 Цыганков Д. А. ЛЮБАВСКИЙ Матвей Кузьмич // Императорский Московский университет: 1755—1917: энциклопедический словарь / составители А. Ю. Андреев, Д. А. Цыганков. — М.: Российская политическая энциклопедия (РОССПЭН), 2010. — С. 404—405. — 894 с. — 2000 экз.

References 
 

1860 births
1933 deaths
Rectors of Moscow State University
Full Members of the USSR Academy of Sciences
Recipients of the Order of St. Anna, 2nd class
Recipients of the Order of St. Vladimir, 3rd class
Recipients of the Order of Saint Stanislaus (Russian), 2nd class
Historians from the Russian Empire
20th-century Russian historians
Soviet historians
Academic staff of Moscow State University
Soviet rehabilitations